IntarS is an Open-Source-Application for ERP and Customer Relationship Management (CRM). Accessibility by using a Web browser.

References

External links 
 
 Download Sourceforge
 www.seat-1.com
 www.linux-community.de/story?storyid=16490
 IntarS-IDE by Dominik Slany

Free customer relationship management software
Free ERP software
Enterprise resource planning software for Linux